Apoyando La Demencia (Supporting Dementia) is a demo released by Chilean rock band, Sinergia, in 1998.

The first half of the demo was recorded in 20 hours on Konstantinopla's Recording Studio after winning Radio Tierra's rock band contest. In 1998 they recorded the rest and finally edited and finished the demo.

This demo was released independently by Sinergia, with their best songs that they have written so far, and a cover of Soda Stereo from their "Canción Animal" album, the song "En El Séptimo Día".

The songs "Chupatrón" and "Santiago U.S.A.", also appear in the debut album of the band.

In this demo album the band experiments with various styles as funk metal, alternative metal, nu metal, jazz fusion and ska.

Track listing
All songs were written by Sinergia, except "En El Séptimo Día".

Credits
 Rodrigo "Don Rorro" Osorio - Vocals
 Pedro "Pedrale" López Figueroa - Guitar
 Alexis "Aneres" Gonzalez - Bass Guitar
 Luis Silva - Drums
 Paul "DJ Panoramix" Eberhard - Turntables, Samplers, Percussion

References

Demo albums
1998 albums
Sinergia albums